Pedro Petrone Schiavone (11 May 1905 – 13 December 1964) was a Uruguayan footballer who played in the role of striker. His nickname was Artillero, meaning artilleryman or gunner, in reference to his amazing goalscoring prowess.

Club career
Throughout his career, Petrone played for Nacional, where he won two National Tournaments (1924, 1934), and in Italy with Fiorentina, where he played 44 games and scored 37 goals; he was the top goalscorer in Serie A during the 1931–32 season). Whilst in Italy, Petrone was timed in the hundred metres at 11 seconds and was said to be the fastest player in the League.

International career
A two-time gold medalist in the 1924 and 1928 Summer Olympics, Petrone also won the 1930 FIFA World Cup with Uruguay. He was 19 years and 1 month old when he received the 1924 gold medal and the tournament top-goalscorer award, still remaining to this day the youngest ever football gold medalist in the history of the Olympic Games.

Petrone won 29 official caps for Uruguay, scoring 24 goals, but early non-FIFA officiated matches would bring his record to 80 caps and 36 goals. He is currently seventh (7th) in the Uruguay top-goalscorers list.

Death
Petrone died in Montevideo in 1964, at the age of 59 years.

Honours

Club
Nacional
  Primera División Uruguaya: 1924, 1933

International
Uruguay
 Olympic Gold Medal: 1924, 1928 
 South American Championship: 1923, 1924; runner-up: 1927; third place: 1929  
 FIFA World Cup: 1930

Individual
 South American Championship Top-scorer: 1923, 1924, 1927
 South American Championship Player of the tournament: 1924
 Olympic Football Tournament Top-scorer: 1924
 Serie A Top-scorer: 1931–32

References

External links

1924 Olympic Football Tournament Top Goalscorer
Uruguay All time World Cup Team
Uruguay Appearance and Goalscoring chart
1928 Olympics, Quarter Final Hat-trick versus Germany national football team

1905 births
1930 FIFA World Cup players
1964 deaths
Uruguayan footballers
Association football forwards
Uruguay international footballers
Olympic footballers of Uruguay
Footballers at the 1924 Summer Olympics
Footballers at the 1928 Summer Olympics
Olympic gold medalists for Uruguay
Medalists at the 1924 Summer Olympics
Medalists at the 1928 Summer Olympics
FIFA World Cup-winning players
Uruguayan Primera División players
Club Nacional de Football players
Serie A players
ACF Fiorentina players
Uruguayan expatriate footballers
Uruguayan people of Italian descent
Expatriate footballers in Italy
Footballers from Montevideo
Olympic medalists in football
Copa América-winning players